North is the fourth studio album by American rock band Matchbox Twenty. It was released on August 28, 2012, in Australia and September 4, 2012, through Atlantic Records worldwide. It is the first album from the band to debut at No. 1 on the Billboard 200, selling 95,000 copies in its first week.<ref name="billboard9-12-2012">{{Cite web |url=http://www.billboard.com/articles/news/475162/matchbox-twenty-gets-first-no-1-album-on-billboard-200-chart |work=Billboard.com |access-date=September 26, 2022 |title=Matchbox Twenty Gets First No. 1 Album on 'Billboard 200 Charts |last=Caulfield |first=Keith}}</ref> It is also the first album of all new material that the band has released since More Than You Think You Are in 2002, although they recorded six new songs for their 2007 compilation album Exile on Mainstream. It is also their first full-length studio album since rhythm guitarist Adam Gaynor's departure from the band in 2005.

Background and recording
In 2004, rhythm guitarist Adam Gaynor left the band. The group then went on hiatus, with the future of the band uncertain. In 2007, the remaining four group members reunited to do a compilation album, and ended up recording seven new songs over the course of one session. For the first time, every member of the group worked on songwriting. After the compilation album was released, the group parted ways again on another hiatus, the group's future still uncertain. Many of Rob Thomas's confidantes urged him to leave the band and focus on his burgeoning solo career, but Thomas did not want to give up on the band and started writing songs intended for the group's next album. Finally, on September 4, 2010, while on VH1's Top 20 Music Video Countdown, Thomas stated that Matchbox Twenty was planning to start working on their next studio album in mid-September of that year.

Due to the band members living in different locations, their first recording sessions took place in New York City, Los Angeles, and Nashville where Rob Thomas, Paul Doucette, and Kyle Cook were living, respectively. As a result of the different recording environments, the group amassed a large amount of new material of various styles which could have become multiple albums. The group had about 60 songs to choose from when they all met up in Nashville and shared a house over a three-month period during the summer of 2011. The group worked on creating a short list of songs for the album, but it was a stressful process, as the group members disagreed on which musical direction the new album should take.

For three months, they argued and drank, in what Thomas described as a "$100,000 bender". One of the major factors that encouraged the group to finally move forward was a visit from record producer Matt Serletic, who they had not worked with since 2002's More Than You Think You Are. The group decided to have Serletic produce the album. Regarding Serletic's return, Paul Doucette stated: "It sort of became evident that bringing someone new to the table was maybe not the best idea. We have such a great shorthand with Matt, it was sort of like, 'What are we waiting for?'" Once they started recording the album at Serletic's Emblem Studios in Calabasas, California, they had narrowed down to about 20 songs. For the first time, the band recorded several songs written solely by Doucette and Brian Yale.

The final album was cut down to 12 songs and was primarily recorded at Emblem Studios with additional recording at Electric Lady Studios, Studio Eleven:17, Sweatshop Studios, and Dark Horse Recording Studio. Five bonus tracks were also recorded for the album. Regarding the album's title, Doucette told Rolling Stone: "The title refers to us finding our way. We went into this record with a lot of material. Many different songs that could have taken us in many different directions. It sort of overwhelmed us for a bit. But, at a certain point, we figured it out. We figured out where 'North' was."

Release
The lead single from the album, "She's So Mean", was released on June 12, 2012. A promotional video for the second single, "Overjoyed", was released on August 28, 2012. The third single, "Our Song", was released on April 13, 2013.

Promotion
In 2012, the band embarked on a worldwide tour, the North Tour, to promote the album. The 2013 Summer Tour co-headlining tour with Goo Goo Dolls later took the band through the United States and Canada.

Commercial performanceNorth'' became the band's first album to debut at number 1 on the US Billboard 200, selling 95,000 copies in its first week. It was certified gold by the Recording Industry Association of America on June 22, 2016. The album also reached number one in Australia, making it Matchbox Twenty's fourth album top the chart there, and was later certified platinum by the Australian Recording Industry Association.

Track listing

Personnel

Matchbox Twenty
Rob Thomas – lead vocals, rhythm guitar, keyboards
Kyle Cook – lead guitar, backing vocals, lead vocals on "The Way"
Paul Doucette – drums, rhythm guitar, backing vocals
Brian Yale – bass guitar

Orchestra
Jeffrey Babko – trombone on "English Town", "Radio"
Glen Berger – baritone saxophone on "Radio"
Brian Dembow – viola on "Parade", "I Will", "English Town"
Steve Erdody – cello on "Parade", "I Will", "English Town"
Walter Fowler – trumpet on "English Town", "Radio"
Julie Gigante – violin on "Parade", "I Will", "English Town"
Glenn Morisette – alto saxophone, tenor saxophone on "Radio"
Lee Thornburg – trumpet on "English Town", "Radio"
Roger Wilkie – violin on "Parade", "I Will", "English Town"

Production
Alex Arias – engineering
James Brown – engineering
Mark Dobson – engineering
Ryan Hewitt – engineering
Ted Jensen – mastering
Ryan Kern – assistant engineering
Derik Lee – engineering
Mike Leisz – assistant engineering 
Chris Lord-Alge – mixing
Eryk Rich – assistant engineering
Matt Serletic – production
Doug Trantow – engineering

Charts and certifications

Weekly charts

Year-end charts

Certifications

References

2012 albums
Matchbox Twenty albums
Albums produced by Matt Serletic
Atlantic Records albums